The 1993–94 NBA season was the Clippers' 24th season in the National Basketball Association, and their 10th season in Los Angeles. In the off-season, the Clippers signed free agent Mark Aguirre, who won two championships with the Detroit Pistons from 1989 to 1990. Under new head coach Bob Weiss, the Clippers played slightly under .500 with an 11–14 start, but then struggled posting a 7-game losing streak between December and January, as Stanley Roberts only played just 14 games due to a ruptured Achilles tendon. The team held a 16–29 record at the All-Star break.

At midseason, the Clippers traded Danny Manning, who was selected for the 1994 NBA All-Star Game, to the Atlanta Hawks in exchange for All-Star forward Dominique Wilkins, while Aguirre was released to free agency after 39 games and retired, averaging 10.6 points per game off the team's bench as their sixth man. The team also signed undrafted rookie forwards Bo Outlaw and Harold Ellis during the season. However, the Clippers would lose 14 of their final 16 games and finish last place in the Pacific Division with a 27–55 record.

Wilkins averaged 29.1 points per game in 25 games for the team after the trade, and was selected to the All-NBA Third Team, while team captain Ron Harper averaged 20.1 points, 6.1 rebounds, 4.6 assists and 1.9 steals per game, and Mark Jackson provided the team with 10.9 points, 8.6 assists and 1.5 steals per game. In addition, Loy Vaught provided with 11.7 points and 8.7 rebounds per game, while second-year center Elmore Spencer contributed 8.9 points, 5.5 rebounds and 1.7 blocks per game, Ellis contributed 8.7 points per game, and Gary Grant averaged 7.5 points, 3.7 assists and 1.5 steals per game off the bench. 

Following the season, Wilkins signed as a free agent with the Boston Celtics, Harper signed with the Chicago Bulls, Jackson was traded to the Indiana Pacers, Weiss was fired as head coach, and Hot Plate Williams was released to free agency after serving a season half suspension due to continuing weight problems.

Draft picks

Roster

Roster notes
 Guard/forward Mark Aguirre was waived on February 1.
 Power forward John "Hot Plate" Williams was suspended indefinitely at midseason due to weight problems, and not maintaining playing shape.

Regular season

Season standings

z - clinched division title
y - clinched division title
x - clinched playoff spot

Record vs. opponents

Game log

Player statistics

Player Statistics Citation:

Awards, records and milestones

All-Star
Danny Manning selected as a reserve forward for the Western Conference All-Stars.  This is his second straight All-Game appearance making Manning the first back-to-back All-Star selection of the franchise since Bob McAdoo then with the Buffalo Braves was selected for four straight All-Star Games from 1974 to 1977.

Transactions
The Clippers were involved in the following transactions during the 1993–94 season.

Trades

Free agents

Additions

Subtractions

Player Transactions Citation:

See also
 Los Angeles Clippers
 Los Angeles Memorial Sports Arena

References

Los Angeles Clippers seasons